The UNIVAC 418 was a transistorized, 18-bit word magnetic-core memory machine made by Sperry Univac. The name came from its 4-microsecond memory cycle time and 18-bit word.  The assembly language for this class of computers was TRIM III and ART418.

Over the three different models, more than 392 systems were manufactured.  It evolved from the Control Unit Tester (CUT), a device used in the factory to test peripherals for larger systems.

Architecture
The instruction word had three formats:
Format I - common Load, Store, and Arithmetic operations
f - Function code (6 bits)
u - Operand address (12 bits)
Format II - Constant arithmetic and Boolean functions
f - Function code (6 bits)
z - Operand address or value (12 bits)
Format III - Input/Output
f - Function code (6 bits)
m - Minor function code (6 bits)
k - Designator (6 bits) used for channel number, shift count, etc.

Numbers were represented in ones' complement, single and double precision.  The TRIM assembly source code used octal numbers as opposed to more common hexadecimal  because the 18-bit words are evenly divisible by 3, but not by 4.

The machine had the following addressable registers:
A - Register (Double precision Accumulator, 36 bits) composed of:
AU - Register (Upper Accumulator, 18 bits)
AL - Register (Lower Accumulator, 18 bits)
ICR - Register (Index Control Register, 3 bits), also designated the "B-register"
SR - Register ("Special Register", 4 bits), a paging register allowing direct access to memory banks other than the executing (P register) bank
P - Register (Program address, 15 bits)

All register values were displayed in real time on the front panel of the computer in binary, with the ability of the user to enter new values via push button (a function that was safe to perform only when the computer was not in run mode).

UNIVAC 418-I
The first UNIVAC 418-I was delivered in June 1963. It was available with 4,096 to 16,384 words of memory.

UNIVAC 1218 Military Computer

The 418-I was also available in a militarized version as the UNIVAC 1218. It required both 115VAC, 1-phase, 60 Hz and 115VAC, 3-phase, 400 Hz power.

UNIVAC 418-II
The first UNIVAC 418-II was delivered in November 1964. It was available with 4,096 to 65,536 (18-bit) words of memory. Memory cycle time was reduced to 2 microseconds.  The militarized version was called the UNIVAC 1219 (known as the "Mk 152 Fire Control Computer.")  It was part of the Navy's Mk 76 missile fire control system, used to control the AN/SPG-55 radar system.

UNIVAC 418-III
The first UNIVAC 418-III was delivered in 1969. It was available with 32,768 to 131,072 words of memory. Memory cycle time was reduced to 750 nanoseconds. New instructions were added for floating-point arithmetic, binary-to-decimal and decimal-to-binary conversions, and block transfers up to 64 words. The SR register was expanded to 6 bits.
The 418-III had two unique hardware features which enabled it to handle continuously high speed serial character streams. One was called the buffer overflow interrupt and the other hardware buffer chaining.   
By the 1990s, all the 418 hardware was gone, but the California Department of Water Resources was still running 418 emulation on a UNIVAC 1100/60.

References

External links

UNIVAC 418 documents on bitsavers.org
UNIVAC 1218 Military Computer 1964 BRL report from Aberdeen Proving Grounds
The Automated Weather Network The USAF creates a real-time network of UNIVAC 418s
18-bit Computers - Computer Unit Tester, 1218 (CP-789), AN/UYK-5 Moonbeam, 1219B-CP-848/UYK , CP-914, ILAAS, 1819, AN/UYK-11(V)
 Article about the Univac 1219 and its use in the Navy's Tartar Missile System
Design of the real-time executive for the Univac 418 system
The Univac 1218 at the System Source Computer Museum

418
Military electronics of the United States
Transistorized computers
18-bit computers